Blackshear Elementary School may refer to:
 Blackshear Elementary School - Blackshear, Georgia - Pierce County Schools
 Blackshear Elementary School - Austin, Texas - Austin Independent School District
 Blackshear Elementary School - Houston, Texas - Houston Independent School District
 Blackshear Elementary School - Harris County, Texas - Klein Independent School District